The Berlin Headquarters and Signal Regiment, also previously known as 29th Signal Regiment was a regiment of the Royal Corps of Signals. The regiment served as the garrison signal regiment for both Cyprus and Berlin.

Cyprus Signal Regiment 
The Regiment traces its history back to the Cyprus District Signal Regiment which was formed in 1955 at Kykko Camp. The regiment ran several geographically  separate outstations:
 
 G Troop at Lakitamia (Jamming)
 Radio Center at Limassol
 Radio Center at Dhekelia
 Radio Center at Paphos
 Radio Center at Platres

By September 1959 the regiment was renumbered as 29th Signal Regiment and in 1962 it was disbanded. The regiment played a role during the Cyprus Emergency confronting EOKA. Following the end of the crisis the regiment's duties were taken over by 15th (Cyprus) Signal Regiment.

Berlin Signal Regiment 
29 Signal Regiment was later reformed again in 1983 by enlarging the former 229 Signal Squadron to form 29 (Berlin) Headquarters and Signal Regiment. In 1986 the 229 squadron was awarded the Freedom of Wilmersdorf.

By 1988 the regiment was retitled as Berlin Headquarters and Signal Regiment. While stationed in Berlin the regiment worked with 4th Signal Group to provide communications from the west to the city. Finally following the end of the Cold War the regiment disbanded. One of its squadrons, 229 Signal Squadron, remained at Stadium Barracks in Berlin until 1994. 229 Squadron then joined 7 Signal Regiment (United Kingdom) and moved to Bradbury Barracks in Krefeld.

References 

Regiments of the Royal Corps of Signals
Military units and formations disestablished in 1994
Military units and formations established in 1955